Below are the rosters for the Copa América 1995 football tournament in Uruguay, from 5 to 23 July 1995. For this edition Mexico and the United States were invited once again.

Group A

Mexico
Head coach: Miguel Mejía Barón

Paraguay
Head coach:   Ladislao Kubala

Uruguay
Head coach: Héctor Núñez

Venezuela
Head coach:  Rafael Santana

Group B

Brazil
Head coach: Mário Zagallo

Colombia
Head coach: Hernán Darío Gómez

Ecuador
Head coach: Francisco Maturana

Peru
Head coach: Miguel Company

Group C

Argentina
Head coach: Daniel Passarella

Bolivia
Head coach:  Antonio López Habas

Chile
Head coach:  Xabier Azkargorta

United States
Head coach: Steve Sampson

References
RSSSF Archive

Squads
Copa América squads